The 2008 Ginetta Junior Championship season in association with Motorsport News was the fourth Ginetta Junior Championship season, the championship designed for racing drivers between the ages of fourteen and seventeen years of age. The season began at Brands Hatch on 29 March 2008 and finished at the same venue on 21 September 2008 , after twenty-four rounds. The championship was won by Muzz Racing's 15-year-old driver Dino Zamparelli, who did enough to hold off the challenge from 16-year-old Thomas Carnaby.

Teams and drivers
All teams and drivers were British-registered. All drivers drove a Ginetta Jnr. car, which is cosmetically based on the Ginetta G20 car, but with different engine and mechanics.

Calendar 
 All rounds , unless stated.

* - Josh Hill had originally qualified on pole but was sent to the back due to changing chassis after qualifying. No pole point was awarded.

Championship Standings
 The best 20 scores by each driver, count towards the championship.

External links
 The home of the Ginetta Junior Championship

Ginetta Junior Championship
Ginetta Junior Championship seasons